Caballe or Caballé is a Catalan surname and may refer to:

 Eduardo Torroja Caballe (1847–1918), Spanish mathematician
 Josep Caballé Domenech (born 1973), Spanish musician and conductor
 Marc Caballé (born 1991), Spanish footballer
 Montserrat Caballé (1933–2018), Spanish operatic soprano

Catalan-language surnames